The Sacred Heart Church is a Roman Catholic church and ecclesiastical parish in North Gosforth, Newcastle upon Tyne. It is part of the Roman Catholic Diocese of Hexham and Newcastle. Situated between Wideopen village to the north and Gosforth Park to the south, the church was made a Grade II listed building in 2006. It is notable for its stained glass windows bearing designs by members of the Pre-Raphaelite Brotherhood, in particular Sir Edward Burne-Jones.

History

St Mary's Church 
The church is a 19th-century former Anglican church, built and donated by Thomas Eustace Smith in the 1860s, and named St Mary's. Use of the church fell following the more general use of St Columba's church in Seaton Burn, which was closer to most of the parish, and the church later closed.

Sacred Heart Church 
The church was bought in 1911 by Bishop Richard Collins, Bishop of the Roman Catholic Diocese of Hexham and Newcastle and endowed to the Diocese. Mass was first led by the Bishop on 28 January 1912, and the church was formally dedicated to the Sacred Heart on 24 June 1912.

List of Incumbent Priests 

{| class="wikitable"
|-
! Date !! Incumbent
|-
| 1912–1918 || George C. Jeffreys 
|-
| 1918–1921 || C. Bede Tuohey
|-
| 1922–1925 || Charles Hart
|-
| 1925–1926 || None 
|-
| 1926–1937 || Charles Hart
|-
| 1930–1937 || C. Bede Tuohey
|-
| 1937–1948 || William T Harris
|-
| 1948–1949 || James O'Brien
|-
| 1949–1962 || James Phelan
|-
| 1962–1964 || William McKenna
|-
| 1964–1984 || Edward Ord
|-
| 1984–2000 || Thomas Cass
|-
| 2000–2008 || Joseph Travers
|-
| 2008–2020 || James Dunne
|-
| 2020–2022 || William Agley 
|-
| 2022-present || Michael Weymes

Architecture 
Built in the 1860s, the church is designed in the Early English Gothic style, although much of the masonry is brick rather than more traditional stone. The architect is unknown, but due to a number of similarities to the church of Baldersby St James in North Yorkshire, the parish believes that it is the work of William Butterfield or one of his students.

Stained glass windows 
The church is notable for its stained glass windows, bearing designs by Pre-Raphaelite artists Edward Burne-Jones, Ford Madox Brown and William Morris.

See also 
 St Mary's Cathedral
 Holy Name parish, Jesmond

Notes

References 

19th-century Roman Catholic church buildings in the United Kingdom
Roman Catholic churches completed in the 1860s
Grade II listed churches in Tyne and Wear
Roman Catholic churches in Tyne and Wear
Gothic Revival church buildings in England
Grade II listed Roman Catholic churches in England